Miguel Ángel Rondelli (born 24 January 1978) is an Argentine football manager, currently in charge of Ecuadorian club Emelec.

Career
After playing in the youth categories of Vélez Sarsfield, All Boys and Lamadrid, Rondelli retired at the age of just 16. He then studied informatics before moving to coaching at the age of 25.

Rondelli subsequently worked in the youth sides of Vélez Sarsfield for twelve years, and moved abroad in 2018, joining Ecuadorian side Universidad Católica del Ecuador and being initially assigned as manager of the youth setup. In October 2021, he was named interim manager of the latter's main squad, along with Omar Andrade, after the departure of Santiago Escobar. 

On 23 December 2021, Católica confirmed Rondelli as the first team manager for the 2022 season. He left the club on 17 November 2022, as his contract was due to expire.

On 29 November 2022, Rondelli replaced Ismael Rescalvo at the helm of Emelec, still in the Ecuadorian top tier.

References

External links

1978 births
Living people
Argentine football managers
Club Atlético Vélez Sarsfield non-playing staff
C.D. Universidad Católica del Ecuador managers
C.S. Emelec managers
Argentine expatriate football managers
Argentine expatriate sportspeople in Ecuador
Expatriate football managers in Ecuador